Honky Tonk Crowd may refer to:
"Honky Tonk Crowd" (John Anderson song)
"Honky Tonk Crowd" (Marty Stuart song), later recorded by Rick Trevino